Russell Edgar Weeks Jr. (born May 12, 1942) is a former American Republican politician who served as a State Senator from West Virginia's 9th Senatorial District. Weeks was elected in 2002, defeating Senate Judiciary Chairman William R. Wooton. Weeks had not served in public office prior to being elected. He was defeated in 2006. He was the Republican nominee at the 2008 West Virginia gubernatorial election but was defeated by Democrat Joe Manchin.

Born May 12, 1942, to Jeanette Weeks and Russ Weeks, Sr. in Beckley, West Virginia, he is a lifelong resident of the city. He is married to Helen C. Peterson with whom he had two children. The couple has three grandchildren.

Weeks did not graduate from high school but began working to help support his mother and siblings. He enlisted in the US Navy and served in Vietnam, commanding a boat in the Mekong Delta.

Returning to Beckley, he became a leader in the Right to Life organization. This advocacy spurred his interest in seeking public office. Weeks won the 2002 election.

His committee assignments  included: Judiciary, Government Organization, Health and Human Resources,
Military, Energy, Industry and Mining, and Agriculture.

Weeks was defeated for re-election in November 2006 by Democrat Mike Green.

In January 2008 it was reported that Weeks was planning to challenge incumbent Governor Joe Manchin in the 2008 election. Russ became the Republican nominee and lost the general election to Manchin.

See also
List of members of the 77th West Virginia Senate
2008 West Virginia gubernatorial election

External links
West Virginia Legislature

References

1942 births
Living people
United States Navy personnel of the Vietnam War
Military personnel from Beckley, West Virginia
Politicians from Beckley, West Virginia
Republican Party West Virginia state senators
United States Navy sailors